The men's 1500 metres at the 2017 Asian Winter Games was held on February 20, 2017 in Sapporo, Japan.

Schedule
All times are Japan Standard Time (UTC+09:00)

Results
Legend
ADV — Advanced
PEN — Penalty

Heats

Heat 1

Heat 2

Heat 3

Heat 4

Heat 5

Heat 6

Heat 7

Semifinals

Heat 1

Heat 2

Heat 3

Finals

Final B

Final A

References

Results summary

External links
Official website

Men 1500